The China Navigation Company. Pte. Ltd. is registered in Singapore, with parent entity - The China Navigation Company Limited (CNCo), trading brands as Swire Shipping & Swire Bulk, is a merchant shipping company based in Singapore. It is part of the Swire group, formerly John Swire and Sons.

CNCo was founded by John Samuel Swire to offer paddle steamer services on the Yangtze River. By the early 1870s John Samuel Swire was convinced that there was an opening for increased steam shipping on the Yangtze River and as he was unable to interest other shipping companies, such as Alfred Holt and Company in undertaking this expansion he decided to establish a new company for this. The China Navigation Company was formed in London in 1872 with a capital of £360,000 chiefly put up by John Samuel Swire and WH Swire with Alfred Holt, Rathbone's, TH Ismay, RN Dale, John Scott, T Barlow and William Imrie and T&J Harrison supplying additional money.

History

Beginnings
John Swire and Sons (JS&S) initially ordered three ships to be built for the Lower Yangtze trade and in 1873 purchased the Union Steam Navigation Company giving CNCo two ships and the leases on property in Shanghai and at other river ports. By the mid-1870s CNCo interests had spread to the Pearl River trade and by the late 1870s to the Shanghai to Ningbo and Shanghai to Tianjin routes, despite periods of intense competition and rates wars as well as pool agreements with the other shipping companies on these routes. In 1883 the Coast Boats Ownery [CBO], which had been formed to handle local coastal trade was fused with the CNCo and in the 1880s and 1890s the CNCo expanded its fleet and the ports of call so that by 1894 it consisted of twenty-nine ships calling at ports along the Yangtze, down the South China coast, in the Philippines, South East Asia, Australia, Japan, Russia and the North China coast.

20th century
Despite problems in Far Eastern trade and affairs in the 20th century, including increased nationalist sentiment and anti-foreign campaigns, boycotts, piracy, staff and salary discontent, and disrupted trade routes due to China's internal civil disturbances, the CNCo fleet continued to operate up to the Second World War and, in 1940, was requisitioned by the British Government for the duration of the war. In autumn 1945 CNCo returned to Hong Kong and Shanghai and, gradually, repossessed shipping and property seized by the Japanese was restored and normal working resumed.

Management

Butterfield and Swire (B&S), which was the Far Eastern trading company of JS&S, was appointed from the formation of CNCo as eastern managers. All correspondence with JS&S, the London Managers, was conducted by the offices in Hong Kong and Shanghai. Shanghai was responsible for the CNCo business on the Yangtze River and the north China coast (from Ningbo north), and Hong Kong handled the south coast and Canton trade and all the South East Asian, Australian and Philippines routes. In many ports the B&S agent acted for CNCo although in some places a separate CNCo office might be established and in the Philippines, Australia and South East Asia, where there were no B&S offices, independent agents were employed.

The company today
Today CNCo is the deep-sea shipping arm of the Swire group. CNCo's managed cargo liner services serve over 130 ports worldwide, employing a mix of specialist owned and chartered vessels carrying container, bulk, break-bulk and project cargoes.

Current fleet
MULTI-PURPOSE VESSELS 
MIHOS
Melanesian Chief (Ex-Coral Chief)
Melanesian Pride (Ex-Highland Chief)
Kokopo Chief
Forum Samoa4 (Ex-Papuan Chief)
CHALLENGERS
Changsha - likely named for MS Changsha (1947), a passenger ship built for CNC by Scotts Shipbuilding and Engineering in Greenock; sold in 1969 to Pacific International Lines and renamed MS Kota Panjang until being sold in 1981 for scrapping in Karachi.
Chekiang
Chenan
Chengtu
Kwangsi
Kwangtung
Kweichow
Kweilin
B170s
Nanchang
Ngankin
Ningpo
S-CLASS
Shansi
Shantung
Shaoshing
Shengking
Shuntien
Siangtan
Soochow
Szechuen
CHIEF-CLASS - New Chief-Class Vessels, delivery 2015
Chief Class - TBN 1
Chief Class - TBN 2
Chief Class - TBN 3
Chief Class - TBN 4

BULK CARRIERS 
Wuchang
Wuchow
Wuhu
Wulin
Eredine
Erradale
Erisort
Eriskay
Fengning
Fengtien
Liangchow
Foochow
Linan
Funing
Lintan
Hanyang
Luchow
Hoihow
Hunan
Hupeh
Pakhoi
Pekin
Poyang
Powan

Notable former vessels

 SS Anhui ( built 1925 was one of only three large vessels, the others being Coast Farmer and Dona Nati, to actually deliver supplies early in the Pacific war to the Philippines from Australia arriving in Cebu City on 20 March 1942. Anhui later operated under U.S. Army control as part of the Southwest Pacific Area permanent local fleet as X-6 from 4 March 1942—September or December 1945.)
 
 MS Changsha
 SS Hanyang ( built 1940 was involved in early Pacific war efforts to supply the Philippines and Netherlands East Indies from Australia and later operated under U.S. Army control as part of the Southwest Pacific Area permanent local fleet as X-8 from 24 March 1942—August 1945.)
 MV Eredine  (sold)
 MV Erradale
 SS Shengking
  (sunk by enemy action)
 MV Soochow  (also known as Maersk Asia Decimo)
 MS Taiyuan
 SS Wang Phu
 SS Wu Chang
 MV Wulin
 SS Yochow ( built 1938 was involved in early Pacific war efforts to supply the Philippines and Netherlands East Indies from Australia and later operated under U.S. Army control as part of the Southwest Pacific Area permanent local fleet as X-7 from 11 April 1942—December 1945.)

Note

References

Bibliography

External links
Company website
WikiSwire website

Shipping companies of Hong Kong
Transport companies established in 1872
Swire Group
1872 establishments in Hong Kong